The Parents of Murdered Children Memorial, sometimes abbreviated as the POMC Memorial, is a memorial to child murder victims, located at Mountain View Cemetery in Oregon City, Oregon, in the United States. The memorial was dedicated in September 2013, becoming the first of its kind in the Pacific Northwest and the eighth in the United States.

Description
The memorial, located in the northwest corner of Mountain View Cemetery in Oregon City, has been described as a "beautiful place for anyone who has lost a loved one or child due to homicide". It features an Oregon/Washington Memorial Wall, a lighted curved wall that encompasses benches, freestanding basalt columns, a spiral-shaped stone walkway and a waterfall over more stonework. It cost $400,000 in cash and in-kind contributions. The memorial was the first of its kind in the Pacific Northwest and the eighth in the United States at the time of its September 2013 dedication.

History

Efforts to construct the memorial were led by Mary Elledge, leader of the Portland area chapter of Parents of Murdered Children (POMC), whose son Rob was murdered.

References

External links

 

2013 establishments in Oregon
Buildings and structures in Oregon City, Oregon
Child murder
Monuments and memorials in Oregon
Murder in Oregon
Murder in Washington (state)